The Mingachevir trolleybus system was a system of trolleybuses forming part of the public transport arrangements in Mingachevir, the fourth most populous city in Azerbaijan, for about 15 years at the turn of the 21st century.

History
The system was opened on 15 April 1989.  At its height, it consisted of three lines.  The only remaining line was closed on 31 March 2006.

Services
The three lines operating at the height of the system were as follows:

 Садоводческое хозяйство (Horticultural Industry) — посёлок АзГРЭС (AzGRÈS)
 Варвары (Barbarians) — Депо (Depot) — Варвары (Barbarians)
 Дормаш (Dormash) — Депо (Depot)

Fleet
The Mingachevir trolleybus fleet comprised 17 vehicles of type ZiU-9. , part of the fleet was still in the depot.

See also

History of Mingachevir
List of trolleybus systems
Trolleybuses in former Soviet Union countries

References

External links

 
 

Mingachevir
Mingachevir
Mingachevir